Arthur A. Telscer (January 17, 1932 – November 26, 1999) was an American pharmacist and politician.

Born in Chicago, Illinois, Telscer received his degree in pharmacy from UIC College of Pharmacy and then owned Wilart Drugs, a pharmacy business, in Chicago. He joined the Republican Party in 1954 and was active with the Young Republicans. In 1966, Telscer was elected to the Illinois House of Representatives as one of three representatives from the 11th Legislative District. He quickly rose to legislative leadership becoming House Majority Whip in 1969. He would go on to be appointed to other leadership positions; Assistant Majority Leader in 1973; Assistant Minority Leader in 1975; Minority Whip in 1977; Assistant Minority Leader in 1979 and Majority Leader in 1981. During his legislative tenure, Telcser was a resident of the Lake View neighborhood. He briefly served as the Speaker of the Illinois House of Representatives. In 1983, Telcser then worked in the Illinois Secretary of State office under George Ryan. In 1998, after Ryan was elected Governor of Illinois, Telscer joined his transition team. Telcser had Parkinson's disease and died at his home in Chicago of a heart attack on November 26, 1999.

Notes

1932 births
1999 deaths
Politicians from Chicago
University of Illinois Chicago alumni
Businesspeople from Chicago
Speakers of the Illinois House of Representatives
Republican Party members of the Illinois House of Representatives
20th-century American businesspeople
20th-century American politicians
American pharmacists